Ramon Goose (born 16 January 1975) is an English guitarist, singer and producer, known for his work with the West African Blues Project and the hip hop blues band NuBlues, for his mastery of the slide guitar, and for producing albums for American blues artists. As a solo artist he has toured across the world performing concerts (including performing at Buckingham Palace) and released several albums to critical acclaim.

Biography
Goose was born and raised in Colchester, Essex, England, influenced by blues, jazz and African music (citing artists such as Ry Cooder and Davey Graham as major influences to his style). He started out with British band NuBlues as guitarist, chief songwriter and producer. With NuBlues he made the album Dreams of a Blues Man (released on Dixiefrog Records in Europe, 21st Century Blues Records in the United States, and published by Metisse Music) and has toured all over Europe, with Eric Burdon, the Blind Boys of Alabama and others; performed with James Brown's bandleader Pee Wee Ellis; and worked with Chris Thomas King. After a short stint with American bluesman Eric Bibb, in 2006, Goose went on to produce, perform on and co-write critically acclaimed albums for other blues artists. His production for Mississippi blues artist Boo Boo Davis was voted Top Ten Blues Album in a MOJO magazine poll in 2006, and his production of Billy Jones (based in Arkansas) — both on Black and Tan Records — also received accolades from critics. Recent projects have included an album with Senegalese musician Diabel Cissokho, and production of the second NuBlues album, Snow on the Tracks. Goose ended 2009 with a tour with his own band, including four performances at maximum security prisons to test his new material, which he released on the album Uptown Blues in 2011. He has continued touring with his world music/blues band (including Cissokho) and performing with artists such as Daby Touré (from Mauritania), Noumoucounda Cissoko (from Senegal), Atongo Zimba (from Ghana)  and the Algerian oud virtuoso Yazid Fentazi and English/Urdu singer Najma Akhtar.

In 2010, Goose formed a side project, the West African Blues Project, to further explore the link between blues and African music (a track of this project is featured on Rough Guide to African blues (World Music Network). In mid 2011, Goose met musician Jim Palmer backstage at WOMAD festival. where Palmer was performing with Baaba Maal. Joining with Modou Toure, Goose and Palmer formed the band Coconut Revolution; an album is expected in early 2013 from Coconut Revolution. In 2012, Goose started working on the Desert Rock, a unique musical project which evolved after he travelled to the Sahara and Dakar, combining his love of Berber and Mandinka rhythms and melodies with blues rock. In the summer of 2014 Goose showcased his new band, World Scatterings, which consists of a cast of musicians from around the world, drawing on elements of blues, folk and African music rhythms. In 2014 Goose will release his new album, Blues & Spirituals, on Acoustic Music Records. In 2016, Goose accepted the opportunity to perform at Buckingham Palace. The same year, he toured with The West African Blues Project across UK and Europe. Goose released, Long Road To Tiznit, which was recorded in Marrakech and London, on 25 August 2017.

Band lineup

Discography

Solo
Mansana Blues, with Diabel Cissokho (2010), Dixiefrog Records
Uptown Blues (2011), Music Avenue Records
Blues and Spirituals (2014), Acoustic Music Records
The West African Blues Project, with Modou Toure (2015), ARC Music
Long Road to Tiznit (2017), World Music Network/ Riverboat Records

With NuBlues
 Dreams of a Blues Man (2004), Dixiefrog/21st Century Records
 Snow on the Tracks (2008), Dixiefrog Records

Albums produced by Goose
 Boo Boo Davis, Drew, Mississippi (2005), Black and Tan Records
 Billy Jones, My Hometown (2006), Black and Tan Records

Select special appearances and compilations
 Putumayo Presents African Blues, various artists (2012)
 West African Blues Project, various artists (Rough Guide to African Blues (3rd ed.), World Music Network, 2014)
 Rethink, Billy Hill and Ramon Goose (Rough Trade, 2015)

Books authored by Goose
 Learn The Ngoni, A Beginners Guide to Learning the N'goni, Desert Road (2018)

Guitars and amplifiers
Ramon uses ESP Navigator Series Guitars. Chapter Guitars (based in London) built him the 'African Guitar'.
Ramon uses Custom by Cougar Mystic Blues ampliers and Bill Krinard Filmosound Projector Amplifiers

References

External links
 official website
 MySpace page for Ramon Goose

1975 births
Living people
English blues guitarists
English male guitarists
English rock guitarists
English songwriters
English record producers
Slide guitarists
Blues rock musicians
Resonator guitarists
Electric blues musicians
People from Colchester
21st-century British guitarists
21st-century British male musicians
British male songwriters